Winnipauk was a station on the Danbury and Norwalk Railroad and later the Danbury Branch of the Housatonic Railroad and the New York, New Haven, and Hartford Railroad. Located in the Winnipauk section of the northern part of Norwalk, Connecticut, the station opened in 1852 and was an important stop that served nearby mills before it was closed in 1929.

History
Coinciding with the opening of the D&N, Winnipauk station opened in February 1852. Located adjacent to the Winnipauk Woolen Mill, the station served as an important stop and was served by 2-3 trains each day through the late 1920s. However, by 1929 passenger service ceased and the station's agent was removed.

Station Layout

The station was located between the main Danbury Line and a shorter spur track that lead into the Winnipauk Woolen Mill complex roughly 1300 feet south of the Merritt Parkway overpass of the Danbury Branch. Uncommon for smaller passenger stations of its time, The station had a large brick depot and had a high level side platform. The large brick depot continued to stand until the Winnipauk Woolen Mill complex was demolished circa 1960.

References

1867 F.W. Beers Atlas of New York and Vicinity
1960 Aerial photo of station site

Former railway stations in Connecticut
Railroad stations in Fairfield County, Connecticut
Buildings and structures in Norwalk, Connecticut
Stations along New York, New Haven and Hartford Railroad lines
1852 establishments in Connecticut
1929 disestablishments in Connecticut
Railway stations opened in 1852
Railway stations closed in 1929